Khalid Aucho (born 8 August 1993) is a Ugandan professional footballer who plays for Tanzanian Premier League club Young Africans and the Uganda national team as a defensive midfielder.

Aucho has played football in various clubs, such as Jinja Municipal Council F.C. from 2009 to 2010, Water F.C from Uganda from 2010 to 2012, Simba FC from Uganda, Tusker from Kenya, Gor Mahia from Kenya, and Baroka from the South African Premier Soccer League. He was on the Uganda team that qualified for the Africa Cup of Nations for the first time in 38 years.

Early life
Aucho was born in Jinja, Uganda. He attended Namagabi Primary School – Kayunga, St Thudus (O-level), Iganga Mixed School (A-level).

Club career

Gor Mahia F.C.
Aucho played for Kenya Premier League side Gor Mahia F.C. from 2015 to May 2016. He joined GorMahia from Tusker and was unveiled on 8 January 2015 at Nyayo Stadium. He scored his first goal for GorMahia on 22 March 2015 in the 41st minute against Chemilli Sugars F.C. with GorMahia winning 3–1. Aucho played his last game for GorMahia on 25 May 2016 at Moi Stadium Kisumu against Sofapaka F.C., where he headed in the opener for the Kenyan champions in the sixth minute, with GorMahia finishing the first leg on top of the table having 29 points.

In July 2016, Aucho went on trial at Scottish Premiership side Aberdeen. The move to Aberdeen collapsed, however, after a transfer fee snag between the clubs. After unsuccessful trials in Scotland, Aucho was signed by Baroka F.C. from South Africa at a fee reported to be 200,000 Rands (approximately KSh1.6million).

Baroka F.C.
On 24 August 2016, Aucho was signed by Premier Soccer League side Baroka F.C. He made his debut on 15 October 2016 in a Premier Soccer League match played at Cape Town Stadium at the 50th minute replacing Chauke Mfundhisii.

Serbia
In February 2017, in the last days of the winter transfer period, Aucho went to Red Star Belgrade following a recommendation by the Uganda national team coach Milutin Sredojević. Red Star immediately sent him to OFK Beograd on loan until the end of the season. Due to administrative problems with missing visa, Aucho formally signed a six-month deal with OFK Beograd. Next the club relegated to the Serbian League Belgrade, Aucho trained with Red Star Belgrade for a period in 2017, after which he left the club in June same year.

India
Aucho joined East Bengal February for last few matches of the 2017–18 I-league and Indian Super Cup. He featured all the four matches of the club in 2018 Indian Super Cup. He was released after the competition.

In September 2018 he joined another Indian club in Churchill Brothers. He made his league debut for the club on 28 October 2018, playing all ninety minutes in a 0–0 away draw with Minerva Punjab. He scored his first league goal for the club on 9 December 2018 in a 4–1 home victory over Aizawl F.C. His goal, assisted by Israil Gurung, was scored in the 23rd minute and made the score 1–0 to Churchill Brothers.

Makkasa SC
In July 2019 Aucho joined Misr Lel Makkasa SC on a two-year contract. In his first season at the club he made 21 appearances scoring twice, in his second season he made 13 appearances.

Young Africans S.C.
Aucho moved to Tanzanian club Young Africans S.C. in August 2021.

International career
Aucho made his debut for the Uganda national team (the "Cranes") against Rwanda in a 1–0 victory at the 2013 CECAFA Cup. He scored his first international goal in a match against Sudan to give his side a 1–0 victory in the group stage of the same competition.

In June 2016, Aucho scored on an overhead kick from his own penalty box in a 2–1 away win over Botswana in a qualifying game for the 2017 Africa Cup of Nations.

Aucho was on the Uganda team that qualified for the Africa Cup of Nations for the first time in 38 years on 4 September 2016.

Aucho was called up by head coach Milutin Sredojević to the Uganda national football team for the 2017 Africa Cup of Nations. He missed the first game against Ghana on 17 January 2017 because of suspension.

Career statistics

International

Scores and results list Uganda's goal tally first, score column indicates score after each Aucho goal.

Honours
Gormahia
Kenyan Premier League: 2015

References

External links
 
 

1993 births
Living people
People from Jinja District
Association football midfielders
Ugandan footballers
Uganda international footballers
Ugandan expatriate footballers
Serbian First League players
Uganda Premier League players
Kenyan Premier League players
South African Premier Division players
I-League players
Egyptian Premier League players
Simba S.C. players
Tusker F.C. players
Gor Mahia F.C. players
Baroka F.C. players
Red Star Belgrade footballers
OFK Beograd players
East Bengal Club players
Churchill Brothers FC Goa players
Misr Lel Makkasa SC players
Young Africans S.C. players
2014 African Nations Championship players
2017 Africa Cup of Nations players
2019 Africa Cup of Nations players
Expatriate footballers in Kenya
Expatriate footballers in Tanzania
Expatriate soccer players in South Africa
Expatriate footballers in Serbia
Expatriate footballers in India
Expatriate footballers in Egypt
Ugandan expatriate sportspeople in Kenya
Ugandan expatriate sportspeople in Tanzania
Ugandan expatriate sportspeople in South Africa
Ugandan expatriate sportspeople in Serbia
Ugandan expatriate sportspeople in India
Ugandan expatriate sportspeople in Egypt
Tanzanian Premier League players